Deborah Jane Trimmer CBE (30 September 192116 October 2007), known professionally as Deborah Kerr, was a British actress. She was nominated six times for the Academy Award for Best Actress.

During her international film career, Kerr won a Golden Globe Award for her performance as Anna Leonowens in the musical film The King and I (1956). Her other major and best known films and performances are The Life and Death of Colonel Blimp (1943), Black Narcissus (1947), Quo Vadis (1951), From Here to Eternity (1953), Tea and Sympathy (1956), An Affair to Remember (1957), Heaven Knows, Mr. Allison (1957), Bonjour Tristesse (1958), Separate Tables (1958), The Sundowners (1960), The Innocents (1961), The Grass Is Greener (1960), and The Night of the Iguana (1964).

In 1994, having already received honorary awards from the Cannes Film Festival and BAFTA, Kerr received an Academy Honorary Award with a citation recognizing her as "an artist of impeccable grace and beauty, a dedicated actress whose motion picture career has always stood for perfection, discipline and elegance".

Early life 
Deborah Jane Trimmer was born on 30 September 1921 in Hillhead, Glasgow, the only daughter of Kathleen Rose (née Smale) and Capt. Arthur Charles Kerr Trimmer, a World War I veteran and pilot who lost a leg at the Battle of the Somme and later became a naval architect and civil engineer. Trimmer and Smale married, both aged 28, on 21 August 1919 in Smale's hometown of Lydney, Gloucestershire.

Young Deborah spent the first three years of her life in the west coast town of Helensburgh, where her parents lived with Deborah's grandparents in a house on West King Street. Kerr had a younger brother, Edmund ("Teddy"), who became a journalist. He died, aged 78, in a road rage incident in 2004.

Kerr was educated at the independent Northumberland House School, Henleaze in Bristol, and at Rossholme School, Weston-super-Mare. Kerr originally trained as a ballet dancer, first appearing on stage at Sadler's Wells in 1938. After changing careers, she soon found success as an actress. Her first acting teacher was her aunt, Phyllis Smale, who worked at a drama school in Bristol run by Lally Cuthbert Hicks. She adopted the name Deborah Kerr on becoming a film actress ("Kerr" was a family name going back to the maternal grandmother of her grandfather Arthur Kerr Trimmer).

Early career

Early theatre and film
Kerr's first stage appearance was at Weston-super-Mare in 1937, as "Harlequin" in the mime play Harlequin and Columbine. She then went to the Sadler's Wells ballet school and in 1938 made her début in the corps de ballet in Prometheus. After various walk-on parts in Shakespeare productions at the Open Air Theatre in Regent's Park, London, she joined the Oxford Playhouse repertory company in 1940, playing, inter alia, "Margaret" in Dear Brutus and "Patty Moss" in The Two Bouquets.

Kerr's first film role was in the British production Contraband (US: Blackout, 1940), aged 18 or 19, but her scenes were cut. She had a strong support role in Major Barbara (1941) directed by Gabriel Pascal.

Film stardom
Kerr became known playing the lead role in the film of Love on the Dole (1941). Said critic James Agate of Love on the Dole, "is not within a mile of Wendy Hiller's in the theatre, but it is a charming piece of work by a very pretty and promising beginner, so pretty and so promising that there is the usual yapping about a new star".

She was the female lead in Penn of Pennsylvania (1941) which was little seen; however Hatter's Castle (1942), in which she starred with Robert Newton and James Mason, was very successful. She played a Norwegian resistance fighter in The Day Will Dawn (1942). She was an immediate hit with the public: an American film trade paper reported in 1942 that she was the most popular British actress with Americans.

Kerr played three women in Michael Powell and Emeric Pressburger's The Life and Death of Colonel Blimp (1943). During the filming, according to Powell's autobiography, Powell and she became lovers:  "I realised that Deborah was both the ideal and the flesh-and-blood woman whom I had been searching for". Kerr made clear that her surname should be pronounced the same as "car". To avoid confusion over pronunciation, Louis B. Mayer, head of Metro-Goldwyn-Mayer billed her as "Kerr rhymes with Star!" Although the British Army refused to co-operate with the producers—and Winston Churchill thought the film would ruin wartime morale—Colonel Blimp confounded critics when it proved to be an artistic and commercial success.

Powell hoped to reunite Kerr and lead actor Roger Livesey in his next film, A Canterbury Tale (1944), but her agent had sold her contract to Metro-Goldwyn-Mayer. According to Powell, his affair with Kerr ended when she made it clear to him that she would accept an offer to go to Hollywood if one were made.

In 1943, aged 21, Kerr made her West End début as Ellie Dunn in a revival of Heartbreak House at the Cambridge Theatre, stealing attention from stalwarts such as Edith Evans and Isabel Jeans. "She has the rare gift", wrote critic Beverley Baxter, "of thinking her lines, not merely remembering them. The process of development from a romantic, silly girl to a hard, disillusioned woman in three hours was moving and convincing".

Near the end of the Second World War, she also toured Holland, France, and Belgium for ENSA as Mrs Manningham in Gaslight (retitled Angel Street), and Britain (with Stewart Granger).

Alexander Korda cast her opposite Robert Donat in Perfect Strangers (1945). The film was a big hit in Britain. So too was the spy comedy drama I See a Dark Stranger (1946), in which she gave a breezy, amusing performance that dominated the action and overshadowed her co-star Trevor Howard. This film was a production of the team of Frank Launder and Sidney Gilliat.

Her role as a troubled nun in the Powell and Pressburger production of Black Narcissus (1947) brought her to the attention of Hollywood producers. The film was a hit in the US, as well as the UK, and Kerr won the New York Film Critics Award as Actress of the Year. British exhibitors voted her the eighth-most popular local star at the box-office in 1947.  She relocated to Hollywood and was under contract to MGM.

Hollywood

Metro-Goldwyn-Mayer

Kerr's first film for MGM in Hollywood was a mature satire of the burgeoning advertising industry, The Hucksters (1947) with Clark Gable and Ava Gardner. She and Walter Pidgeon were cast in If Winter Comes (1947). She received the first of her Oscar nominations for Edward, My Son (1949), a drama set and filmed in England co-starring Spencer Tracy.

In Hollywood, Kerr's British accent and manner led to a succession of roles portraying refined, reserved, and "proper" English ladies. Kerr, nevertheless, used any opportunity to discard her cool exterior. She had the lead in a comedy Please Believe Me (1950).

Kerr appeared in two huge hits for MGM in a row. King Solomon's Mines (1950) was shot on location in Africa with Stewart Granger and Richard Carlson. This was immediately followed by her appearance in the religious epic Quo Vadis (1951), shot at Cinecittà in Rome, in which she played the indomitable Lygia, a first-century Christian.

She then played Princess Flavia in a remake of The Prisoner of Zenda (1952) with Granger and Mason.  In between Paramount borrowed her to appear in Thunder in the East (1951) with Alan Ladd.
 
In 1953, Kerr "showed her theatrical mettle" as Portia in Joseph Mankiewicz's Julius Caesar. She made Young Bess (1953) with Granger and Jean Simmons, then appeared alongside Cary Grant in Dream Wife (1953), a flop comedy.

From Here to Eternity and Broadway
Kerr  departed from typecasting with a performance that brought out her sensuality, as "Karen Holmes", the embittered military wife in Fred Zinnemann's From Here to Eternity (1953), for which she received an Oscar nomination for Best Actress. The American Film Institute acknowledged the iconic status of the scene from that film in which Burt Lancaster and she romped illicitly and passionately amidst crashing waves on a Hawaiian beach. The organisation ranked it 20th in its list of the 100 most romantic films of all time.

Having established herself as a film actress in the meantime, she made her Broadway debut in 1953, appearing in Robert Anderson's Tea and Sympathy, for which she received a Tony Award nomination. Kerr performed the same role in Vincente Minnelli's film adaptation released in 1956; her stage partner John Kerr (no relation) also appeared. In 1955, Kerr won the Sarah Siddons Award for her performance in Chicago during a national tour of the play. After her Broadway début in 1953, she toured the United States with Tea and Sympathy.

Peak years of stardom

Thereafter, Kerr's career choices would make her known in Hollywood for her versatility as an actress.  She played the repressed wife in The End of the Affair (1955), shot in England with Van Johnson. She was a widow in love with William Holden in The Proud and Profane (1956), directed by George Seaton. Neither film was much of a hit. However  Kerr then played Anna Leonowens in the film version of the Rodgers and Hammerstein musical The King and I (1956); with Yul Brynner in the lead, it was a huge hit. Marni Nixon dubbed Kerr's singing voice.

She played a nun in Heaven Knows, Mr. Allison (1957) opposite her long-time friend Robert Mitchum, directed by John Huston. It was very popular as was An Affair to Remember (1957) opposite Cary Grant.

Kerr starred in two films with David Niven: Bonjour Tristesse (1958), directed by Otto Preminger, and Separate Tables (1958), directed by Delbert Mann; the latter movie was particularly well received.

She made two films at MGM: The Journey (1959) reunited her with Brynner;  Count Your Blessings (1959), was a comedy. Both flopped, as did Beloved Infidel (1959) with Gregory Peck.

Later films

Kerr was reunited with Mitchum in The Sundowners (1960) shot in Australia, then The Grass Is Greener (1960), co-starring Cary Grant. She appeared in Gary Cooper's last film The Naked Edge (1961) and starred in The Innocents (1961) where she plays a governess tormented by apparitions.

Kerr made her British TV debut in "Three Roads to Rome" (1963). She was another governess in The Chalk Garden (1964) and worked with John Huston again in The Night of the Iguana (1964).

She joined Dean Martin and Frank Sinatra in a love triangle for a romantic comedy, Marriage on the Rocks (1965).

In 1965, the producers of Carry On Screaming! offered her a fee comparable to that paid to the rest of the cast combined, but she turned it down in favour of appearing in an aborted stage version of Flowers for Algernon. She replaced Kim Novak in Eye of the Devil (1966) with Niven, and was reteamed with Niven in the comedy Casino Royale (1967), achieving the distinction of being, at 45, the oldest "Bond Girl" in any James Bond film, until Monica Bellucci, at the age of 50, in Spectre (2015). Casino Royale was a hit as was another movie she made with Niven, Prudence and the Pill (1968).

Pressure of competition from younger, upcoming actresses made her agree to appear nude in John Frankenheimer's The Gypsy Moths (1969), the only nude scene in her career. She made The Arrangement (1969) with Elia Kazan, her director from the stage production of Tea and Sympathy.  She returned to the cinema one more time in 1985's The Assam Garden.

Theatre
Concern about the parts being offered to her, as well as the increasing amount of nudity included in films, led her to abandon the medium at the end of the 1960s, with one exception in 1985, in favour of television and theatre work.

Kerr returned to the London stage in many productions including the old-fashioned, The Day After the Fair (Lyric, 1972), a Peter Ustinov comedy, Overheard (Haymarket, 1981) and a revival of Emlyn Williams's The Corn is Green. After her first London success in 1943, she toured England and Scotland in Heartbreak House.

In 1975, she returned to Broadway, creating the role of Nancy in Edward Albee's Pulitzer Prize-winning play Seascape.

In 1977, she came back to the West End, playing the title role in a production of George Bernard Shaw's Candida.

The theatre, despite her success in films, was always to remain Kerr's first love, even though going on stage filled her with trepidation:

Television
Kerr experienced a career resurgence on television in the early 1980s when she played the role of the nurse (played by Elsa Lanchester in the 1957 film of the same name) in Witness for the Prosecution, with Sir Ralph Richardson. She also did A Song at Twilight (1982).

She took on the role of the older Emma Harte, a tycoon, in the adaptation of Barbara Taylor Bradford's A Woman of Substance (1984). For this performance, Kerr was nominated for an Emmy Award.

Kerr rejoined old screen partner Mitchum in Reunion at Fairborough (1985).  Other TV roles included Ann and Debbie (1986) and Hold the Dream (1986), the latter a sequel to A Woman of Substance.

 Personal life 
Kerr's first marriage was to Squadron Leader Anthony Bartley RAF on 29 November 1945. They had two daughters, Melanie Jane (born 27 December 1947) and Francesca Ann (born 18 December 1951, who married to the actor John Shrapnel). The marriage was troubled, owing to Bartley's envy of his wife's fame and financial success, and because her career often took her away from home. They divorced in 1959.

Her second marriage was to author Peter Viertel on 23 July 1960. In marrying Viertel, she became stepmother to Viertel's daughter, Christine Viertel. Although she long resided in Klosters, Switzerland, and Marbella, Spain, Kerr moved back to Britain to be closer to her own children as her health began to deteriorate. Her husband, however, continued to live in Marbella.

Stewart Granger claimed in his autobiography that in 1945 she had approached him romantically in the back of his chauffeur-driven car at the time he was making Caesar and Cleopatra. Although he was married to Elspeth March, he states that he and Kerr went on to have an affair. When asked about this revelation, Kerr's response was, "What a gallant man he is!"

 Death 

Kerr died aged 86 on 16 October 2007 at Botesdale, a village in the county of Suffolk, England, from the effects of Parkinson's disease."From Here to Eternity actress Kerr dies."  CNN. 18 October 2007

Within three weeks of her death, her husband Peter Viertel died of cancer on 4 November. At the time of Viertel's death, director Michael Scheingraber was filming the documentary Peter Viertel: Between the Lines, which includes reminiscences concerning Kerr and the Academy Awards.

 Work 
 Film 

 Television 

 Theatre 

 Radio 

 Awards and nominations 

Academy Awards

She is tied with Thelma Ritter and Amy Adams as the actresses with the second most nominations without winning, surpassed only by Glenn Close, who has been nominated eight times without winning.

British Academy Film Awards

Primetime Emmy Awards

Golden Globe Awards

NYFCC Awards

 Honours 

Kerr was made a Commander of the Order of the British Empire (CBE) in 1998, but was unable to accept the honour in person because of ill health. She was also honoured in Hollywood, where she received a star on the Hollywood Walk of Fame at 1709 Vine Street for her contributions to the motion picture industry.

Although nominated six times as Best Actress, Kerr never won a competitive Oscar. In 1994, Glenn Close presented Kerr with the Honorary Oscar for lifetime achievement with a citation recognising her as "an artist of impeccable grace and beauty, a dedicated actress whose motion picture career has always stood for perfection, discipline and elegance".

Kerr won a Golden Globe Award for "Best Actress – Motion Picture Musical or Comedy" for The King and I in 1957 and a Henrietta Award for "World Film Favorite – Female". She was the first performer to win the New York Film Critics Circle Award for "Best Actress" three times (1947, 1957 and 1960).

Although she never won a BAFTA or Cannes Film Festival award in a competitive category, both organisations gave Kerr honorary awards: a Cannes Film Festival Tribute in 1984 and a BAFTA Special Award in 1991.

In September and October 2010, Josephine Botting of the British Film Institute curated the "Deborah Kerr Season", which included around twenty of her feature films and an exhibition of posters, memorabilia and personal items loaned by her family.

In September 2021, Kerr's grandsons, Joe and Lex Shrapnel, unveiled a memorial plaque at the former family home in Weston-super-Mare.

On 30 September 2021, on what would have been Kerr's one hundredth birthday, the Lord Provost of Glasgow, Philip Braat, unveiled a memorial plaque in Ruskin Terrace, on the site of the nursing home where Kerr was born.

 References 

Bibliography
 Braun, Eric. Deborah Kerr. St. Martin's Press, 1978. .
 Capua, Michelangelo. Deborah Kerr. A Biography. McFarland, 2010. .
 Street, Sarah. Deborah Kerr. British Film Institute, 2018. .
 Powell, Michael. A Life in Movies. Heinemann, 1986. .
 Andrew, Penelope. "Deborah Kerr: An Actress in Search of an Author". Bright Lights Film Journal, May 2011, Issue #72. Deborah Kerr: An Actress in Search of an Author, (c) Penelope Andrew, 2011.

 External links 

 
 
 
 
 Deborah Kerr "Rhymes with Star" tribute site
 Deborah Kerr at Helensburgh Heroes.
 The Enigma of Deborah Kerr, ephemera, media files and essay at cinemagraphe.com.
 "From Kerr To Eternity", 55th Sydney Film Festival Deborah Kerr retrospective (2008).
 Deborah Kerr Rhymes With Star, and What a Star She Was: She Deserves to be Remembered, Too, Huffington Post, 7 April 2008.
 Deborah Kerr tribute by Spanish director Pedro Almodóvar, whose script for his film Broken Embraces'' was influenced by his reflections on her at the time of her death.
 Extensive collection of press articles from the 1940s to 2000s, photo galleries and other information at deborahkerr.es (April 2009).
 Photographs and literature at virtual-history.com.

1921 births
2007 deaths
20th-century Scottish actresses
Academy Honorary Award recipients
BAFTA winners (people)
Best Musical or Comedy Actress Golden Globe (film) winners
British expatriates in Spain
British expatriates in Switzerland
Commanders of the Order of the British Empire
Neurological disease deaths in England
Deaths from Parkinson's disease
Donaldson Award winners
David di Donatello winners
Metro-Goldwyn-Mayer contract players
People from Helensburgh
Scottish film actresses
Scottish stage actresses
Scottish television actresses
Actresses from Glasgow
People from Mid Suffolk District
British expatriate actresses in the United States